James Christian (Chris) Bollwage is the mayor of Elizabeth, New Jersey, the state's fourth-largest city. A lifelong resident of Elizabeth, he was elected into his first term in 1992, and reelected in November 1996, 2000, 2004, 2008, 2012, 2016 and 2020. He has been the president of the New Jersey State League of Municipalities.

He is a 1972 graduate of St. Mary of the Assumption High School. He graduated from Kean University with a bachelor's degree in 1981 and with a master's degree in 1989. Kean University gave Bollwage an honorary degree in 2002. Bollwage is an adjunct professor in the Public Administration Department at Kean University.

Bollwage's vision of the future of Elizabeth included "Go-Green" initiatives, collegiate corridor concept, remodeling of Midtown train station, and expansion of economic development, recreation, housing and transportation. He also unveiled a foreclosure assistance program, a Healthy Elizabeth initiative and camera surveillance network.

See also 
List of longest-serving mayors in the United States

References 

Living people
New Jersey city council members
New Jersey Democrats
Mayors of Elizabeth, New Jersey
1954 births
Kean University alumni
Kean University faculty
21st-century American politicians